The BRIT School is a British performing and creative arts school located in Selhurst, Croydon, England, with a mandate to provide education and vocational training for the performing arts, music, music technology, theatre, musical theatre, dance, applied theatre, production arts and the creative arts film and media production (FMP), interactive digital design (IDD), visual arts and design (VAD). Selective in its intake but free to attend, the school is notable for its celebrity alumni.

Opened on 22 October 1991 under the CTC programme, the school is funded by the British Government with support from the British Record Industry Trust and other charity partners and donations and maintains an independent school status from the local education authority.

History

Mark Featherstone-Witty had been inspired by Alan Parker's 1980s film Fame to create a secondary school specialising in the performing arts. By the time he started trying to raise money through the School for Performing Arts Trust (SPA), he had refined a novel integrated curriculum. He approached Sir Richard Branson to be the project champion who agreed, on the condition that other record companies chipped in. As it happened, the British Phonographic Industry (BPI) were concerned with home taping and realised they had no political influence to bring the necessary pressure to bear. The then Conservative government needed to give impetus to their flagging City Technology College scheme.

For over 30 years, the BRIT School has been the beneficiary of funding from the British record industry, with a substantial annual contribution from the proceeds of the Brit Awards, administered via the record industry's charity, the BRIT Trust.

In 2012, the school expanded acquiring part of the former Selhurst High School building next door. Three new courses, Production Arts, Interactive Digital Design and Community Arts Practise were introduced to coincide with this. There are currently 1352 Students on roll. The school's former principal Sir Nick Williams was knighted in the New Years Honours List 2013 for services to education.

In 2021/2022 The school celebrated its 30th birthday and was awarded a PRS Music heritage award shaping UK Art and culture for 30 years

Educational focus

The school was founded in 1991 under the auspices of the City Technology Colleges (CTC) initiative with sponsorship from the British Record Industry Trust (BRIT). Each year the BRIT Awards Music Ceremony raises money, some of which is used to help the continuing sponsorship of the school along with other music charities.

The school recognises that most of its students intend to make a career in the arts, entertainment and communications industries, but the school expects all to follow full-time courses to completion. It has two professional theatres, the Obie Theatre, which can seat audiences of up to 324 and standing audiences up to 500; and the BRIT Theatre, which opened in January 2012 and seats audiences of up to 280. There are also various dance studios, musical theatre studios, and TV and radio studios. 

YouTube Music funded a new Television Studio that opened in 2019 for Film & Media Production students. This was in response to the student-run show "The BRIT Live" which airs on the BRIT School's YouTube channel, giving the students their own studio and control room to broadcast from.

Entry requirements
Entry to any of the school's courses is initially by application. If applicants meet the initial entry criteria, they may then be invited to interview or audition in their chosen focus (strand) (either Film and Media Production (FMP), Applied Theatre, Dance, Interactive Digital Design, Music, Music Technology, Musical Theatre, Production Arts, Theatre and Visual Arts & Design, for sixth-form entry students), plus a meeting with relevant tutors.  Entry to the Music course also includes aural and music theory tests and an audition, with entry to the Dance, Theatre, Visual Art & Design and Musical Theatre courses also including audition rounds.

The school has a wide catchment for students, who often live away from school. Several students in foreign countries are accepted and move to London to attend the school.

A 2011 BBC News article discussed whether students who are accepted by the school get an unfair advantage in creative arts industries over those who did not.

Curriculum 

The school teaches the following course:

Notable alumni

 Ace and Vis (TV/radio presenters)
 Adele (singer-songwriter)
 Amy Winehouse (singer-songwriter)
 Ashley Madekwe (actor)
 Archie Madekwe (actor)
 Bashy (rapper/actor)
 Billie Black (singer)
 Black Midi (band)
 Blake Harrison (actor)
 Breakage (musician)
 Cat Burns (singer)
 Cash Carraway (screenwriter/showrunner)
 Cat Sandion (presenter)
 Charlene Soraia (singer)
 Cormac Hyde-Corrin (actor, filmmaker)
 Cush Jumbo (actor)
 Dan Gillespie Sells of the band The Feeling
 Dane Bowers (singer-songwriter and former member of Another Level)
 Ella Eyre (singer-songwriter)
 Eman Kellam (presenter/YouTuber)
 Emily Head (actor)
 FKA Twigs (singer-songwriter and dancer)
 Freya Ridings (singer)
 Gemma Cairney (radio presenter)
 Harrison Osterfield (actor and model)
 Imogen Heap (singer)
 Jade Bird (singer)
 Jamie Isaac (singer-songwriter)
 Jamie Woon (singer)
 Jessica Morgan (singer)
 Jessie J (singer-songwriter)
 Joel Pott (singer/frontman of Athlete)
 Joivan Wade (actor)
 Kae Tempest (spoken word performer, poet, recording artist, novelist and playwright)
 Kate Nash (singer-songwriter)
 Katie Melua (singer-songwriter)
 Katy B (singer-songwriter)
 Kellie Shirley (actor)
 King Krule (singer)
 Laura Angela Collins (poet, producer, author)
 Laura Dockrill (poet, author and illustrator)
 Leona Lewis (singer-songwriter)
 Benjamin Coyle-Larner (rapper, under the stage name Loyle Carner)
 Luke Pritchard (singer)
 Lynden David Hall (singer)
 Marsha Ambrosius (singer-songwriter and member of Floetry)
 Maya Delilah (singer-songwriter and guitarist)
 Nancy Sullivan (actress)
 Natalie Stewart (singer and member of Floetry)
 Nathan Stewart-Jarrett (actor)
 Octavian (rapper)
 Olivia Dean (singer)
 Percelle Ascott (actor)
 Polly Scattergood (singer)
 Raye (singer-songwriter)
 Rex Orange County (singer-songwriter/producer)
 Rhianne Barreto (actress) 
 Richard Jones of the band The Feeling
 Rickie Haywood Williams (presenter, Kiss FM)
 Rizzle Kicks (hip hop duo)
 Robert Emms (actor)
 Róisín Mullins, (dancer and presenter)
 Shawn Emanuel (singer)
 Shelby Logan Warne (singer and multi-instrumentalist)
 Shingai Shoniwa of the band Noisettes (singer)
 Stuart Matthew Price (singer)
 Tania Foster (singer)
 Talia Mar (singer and Internet personality)
 Tara McDonald (singer)
 Tom Holland (actor)
 Twist and Pulse (performers)
 Will Bayley (Paralympian)
 Timothy Bennett, Councillor, Totnes Town Council, attended 1997-1999

References

External links
  Official website
 The BRIT Trust

City technology colleges in England
Educational institutions established in 1991
Secondary schools in the London Borough of Croydon
Educational charities based in the United Kingdom
 
Schools of the performing arts in the United Kingdom
Dance schools in the United Kingdom
Science and technology in London
1991 establishments in England